Grevillea baueri, commonly known as Bauer's grevillea, is a species of flowering plant in the family Proteaceae and is endemic to the coastal ranges of south-eastern New South Wales. It is a low, spreading to erect shrub with mostly oblong to egg-shaped leaves with red to pink and cream-coloured or yellow flowers.

Description

Taxonomy
Grevillea baueri was first formally described in 1810 by botanist Robert Brown in Transactions of the Linnean Society of London. The specific epithet honours brothers Franz and Ferdinand Bauer who were both noted botanical illustrators from Austria.

In 1986, Donald McGillivray described two subspecies of G. baueri and the names are accepted by the Australian Plant Census:

Distribution and habitat
Subspecies asperula grows in heath or open woodland from near Nerriga to near Nowra and the northern edge of the Budawang Range and subsp. baueri is found in woodland and heath between Camden, Picton, Mittagong and Bundanoon in the coastal ranges of south-eastern New South Wales.

Use in horticulture
This species has attractive foliage and flowers although the latter blacken after maturity, which can detract from the overall appearance. It is frost hardy in Australia and preferes a position with reasonable drainage and in full sun or partial shade. Plants are propagated by cuttings.

References

Flora of New South Wales
baueri
Proteales of Australia
Garden plants of Australia
Taxa named by Robert Brown (botanist, born 1773)
Plants described in 1810